Aisha "Lady Aisha" Kyomuhangi is a Ugandan actress, singer and producer. She has starred in numerous stage productions including  Kigenya Agenya. She is also a member of Bakayimbira Dramactors, one of Uganda's oldest stage drama groups.

Career 
Aisha has  been acting for over 20 years. She has worked on numerous films including  ‘The Last King of Scotland’. She is popular for her roles in Ugandan TV series ‘Byansi ,’The Honorables’ and ‘Mistakes Galz Do’ that airs on NTV and Pearl Magic. In 2019, she produced her first film Kemi which she stars in herself as the titular character of her production company Faisha Pictures International. She has been nominated for Best actress in TV drama for the (Honourablez)

She launched her debut album titled Onsiibya mu Ssanyu in August 2006 at Grand Imperial Hotel.

Personal life
She is a mother of one and formally married to actor Charles Ssenkubuge.

Filmography

Film
Kemi - The Final Tragedy(2019)

Stage
Embagga ya Kony
Ekijjomanyi (The Mosquitoes)
Enyana Ekutudde
Ndiwulira

Television
The Honourables

Discography
Onsiibya Mussanyu
Wenga (2010)
Kanelage (2010) ft Miss Vanilla 
Sili fala (2012)
Ma Sheri (2018)

Awards and nominations

Nominations
Best New artist- 2002 Pearl of Africa Music Awards (PAM)
Best actress in TV drama - The Honourables

References

External links
 
 

21st-century Ugandan women singers
21st-century Ugandan actresses
Ugandan film actresses
Ugandan television actresses
Year of birth missing (living people)
Living people